The Skyvue Las Vegas Super Wheel (also capitalized SkyVue) is an unfinished giant Ferris wheel near the Mandalay Bay Hotel and Casino on the Las Vegas Strip in Paradise, Nevada, US. , only the concrete pillars have been built. Construction of the wheel and the proposed larger 3-phase project for the site — London, Las Vegas — have been abandoned, and the plot has been advertised for sale.

London, Las Vegas, as suggested by the official website, was to be a 38.5-acre property featuring 1,300 hotel rooms, a casino, the Skyvue wheel and 550,000 square feet of restaurants and shops—all of which would be architectural replicas of various British landmarks and neighborhoods.

The Skyvue wheel, being "Phase I of London, Las Vegas" was intended to feature a large display billed as the "largest outdoor advertising LED screen in the world".

History
Approved by Clark County Commission in March 2011, it was announced at a media event and groundbreaking ceremony in May 2011 by Howard Bulloch of Compass Investments, who stated "We expect it to be up and running in time for New Year's 2012." The Happi Inn motel was demolished to make way for the Ferris wheel. It was originally expected to have 40 gondolas, each carrying 20-25 people, but in March 2012, when 1,300 cubic yards of concrete foundations were poured it was reported that there would only be 32 gondolas, each carrying 24 passengers, and that it would not open until July 4, 2013.

On March 5, 2012, Shotgun Creek Investments, headed by Wayne Perry, announced their involvement in the $300 million project. Shotgun Creek "invested tens of millions" into the project according to a statement from Skyvue.

In early 2013, Shotgun Creek made two loans totaling $9 million in the project.

A March 2013 update indicated the spindle and yoke were being assembled off site and would be installed "shortly". In July 2013, the developer stated "We anticipate construction to resume in the next couple of months." The projected opening was delayed until mid-2015. In January 2014, all scaffolding was removed from the columns, furthering speculation that the project will never be finished.

By November 2015, the property and unfinished Skyvue had been put up for sale. It was put up for sale again in 2020, and was sold to Perry later that year. He put the site up for sale in 2022.

See also 
 Voyager, a giant Ferris wheel proposed several times for Las Vegas, but never built.
 High Roller, a giant Ferris wheel built in Las Vegas next to The Linq casino and resort.

References

External links

Las Vegas Strip
Ferris wheels
Unfinished buildings and structures